The men's beach volleyball tournament at the 2018 Asian Games took place at the JSC Beach Volley Arena, Palembang, Indonesia from 19 to 28 August 2018.

Schedule
All times are Western Indonesia Time (UTC+07:00)

Results

Preliminary round

Pool A

Pool B

Pool C

Pool D

Pool E

Pool F

Pool G

Pool H

Knockout round

Final standing

References

External links
Beach volleyball at the 2018 Asian Games

Men